The Great Mosque of Malatya is a Seljuk mosque in Battalgazi, Malatya Province, Turkey. The mosque was originally built in the 13th century, and was destroyed in the 2023 Turkey–Syria earthquake.

See also 
 List of Turkish Grand Mosques

References 

Mosques completed in the 13th century
Buildings and structures in Malatya
Seljuk mosques in Turkey
Buildings damaged by the 2023 Turkey–Syria earthquake
Malatya